Springdale Lake is a reservoir in Polk County, in the U.S. state of Georgia.

Springdale Lake was built in the mid-20th century as the central feature of a planned community.

See also
List of lakes in Georgia (U.S. state)

References

Geography of Polk County, Georgia
Reservoirs in Georgia (U.S. state)